Heath L. Wingate (born December 5, 1944) is a former American football center in the National Football League for the Washington Redskins.  He played college football at Bowling Green State University and was drafted in the thirteenth round of the 1966 NFL Draft.

References

1944 births
Living people
Sportspeople from Toledo, Ohio
Players of American football from Ohio
American football centers
Bowling Green Falcons football players
Washington Redskins players